The 2017 IUP Crimson Hawks football team represented Indiana University of Pennsylvania in the 2017 NCAA Division II football season. It was the first season for the team with head coach Paul Tortorella.

Background

Previous season
In 2016 the Crimson Hawks finished with a 10–2 record including a 6–1 conference record. The team made it PSAC Semi-Finals

Departures

Schedule

Rankings

Roster

References

IUP
IUP Crimson Hawks football seasons
Pennsylvania State Athletic Conference football champion seasons
IUP Crimson Hawks football